Ryan Dean Kiesel is a former Democratic Party member of the Oklahoma House of Representatives, representing District 28. He is now Executive Director of the American Civil Liberties Union of Oklahoma.

Early life and career
Kiesel was born on January 15, 1980, in Oklahoma City, Oklahoma. Kiesel is a fifth generation Seminole County resident. He received a bachelor's degree in political science with a minor in history from the University of Oklahoma, graduating with honors. In 2006 he earned his Juris Doctor degree from the University of Oklahoma College of Law, graduating with honors. Among his many honors from the College of Law, Kiesel received the Paul K. Frost Award for his distinguished academic performance and commitment to public service. A Carl Albert Public Intern, Kiesel worked as a policy analyst for the Oklahoma State Senate and as a leadership staff member to Senator Kelly Haney.

Political career
Kiesel won election to the Oklahoma House of Representatives from District 28 in 2004, while he was still a law student. In 2005 he was named the Legislative Newcomer of the Year by the Higher Education Alumni Council and in 2008 he was honored as a Friend of Higher Education. He won reelection in 2006 and 2008.

Private life
Kiesel is a former active participant in The Seminole Elks Lodge, the Black Historical Research Project, Rotary International, the Seminole and Wewoka Chambers of Commerce, and serves on the Board of Directors of the Jasmine Moran Children's Museum.  His wife, Allison, is a pharmacist. Rounding out the Kiesel household are their three dogs (Clinton, Kennedy, and Truman) and two cats (Calvin and Roosevelt). The Kiesels are members of the First United Methodist Church in Seminole.  Ryan's hobbies include discovering new music, reading, traveling near and far with his wife, and spending time with friends and family.

References

External links
Oklahoma House of Representatives
Ryan Dean Kiesel Complete Bio, VoteSmart.org
Follow the Money - Ryan Kiesel
2008 2006 2004 campaign contributions

Democratic Party members of the Oklahoma House of Representatives
Oklahoma lawyers
1980 births
Living people
21st-century American politicians
American Civil Liberties Union people